Marie is an unincorporated community in Summers County and Monroe County, West Virginia, United States, located southeast of Hinton.

The community was named after Gladys Marie Berger, a former resident.

References

Unincorporated communities in Summers County, West Virginia
Unincorporated communities in West Virginia